Henry Arundell (born 8 November 2002) is an English rugby union player for London Irish in Premiership Rugby, his preferred position is full back.

Early life 
Arundell was born on a Royal Air Force base in Dhekelia, a British overseas territory on the island of Cyprus. His father, Ralph Arundell, was an army officer in The Rifles (formerly The Light Infantry) for thirty years. His father has done tours in both Iraq and Afghanistan. His mother, Jane Arundell is an Adult and Paediatric Nurse, a qualified Health Visitor and works in the NHS as a Public Health Team Leader in Wiltshire. Henry started his sporting career at Holt VC Primary School where he excelled in all sports. Henry attended Harrow School, an all-boys boarding school in London and has been with London Irish since he was 14 years old.

Career
Arundell was highlighted as "one to watch" in the 2022 Six Nations Under 20s Championship, and was joint-top try scorer in the competition with four. A number of Arundell's performances and tries drew attention including two tries against Leicester Tigers in a Premiership Rugby Cup semi-final, a 20-minute substitute appearance against Wasps where Arundell scored a try and was named Man of the Match in a 25-point comeback, and a try that started on his own goal-line against Toulon, which gained widespread coverage.

His performances for London Irish saw him named as Premiership Rugby's young player of the season for 2021-22. 

On 10 June 2022 Arundell signed a new contract with London Irish described as "long term". He was then named as an "apprentice player" in 's squad for the summer tour in Australia. He scored a try, from his first touch, on his debut on 2 July 2022, coming on from the bench.

International tries 
As of 12 February 2023

References

External links 

2002 births
Living people
English rugby union players
London Irish players
Rugby union fullbacks
People educated at Harrow School
England international rugby union players